Lee Gareth Fitzpatrick (born 31 October 1978) in Manchester, England, is an English retired professional footballer who played as a midfielder for Blackburn Rovers and Hartlepool United in the Football League.

He is the older brother of former Halifax Town striker Ian Fitzpatrick.

References

1978 births
Living people
Footballers from Manchester
English footballers
Association football midfielders
Blackburn Rovers F.C. players
Hartlepool United F.C. players
Stevenage F.C. players
Leigh Genesis F.C. players
Rossendale United F.C. players
Droylsden F.C. players
Ashton United F.C. players
Radcliffe F.C. players
English Football League players